Famous Classic Tales is an animated anthology television series featuring animated adaptations of classic children's stories which aired on CBS from 1970 to 1984. The series was produced by the Australian division of Hanna-Barbera and Air Programs International (API), also from Australia. However, the thirtieth installment was animated by Ruby-Spears Enterprises.

Overview 
Famous Classic Tales was broadcast on CBS and distributed by Kids Klassics Home Video and Storybook World. It had cartoons from API's Family Classic Tales. Featured cartoons included adaptions of classic literature such as Gulliver's Travels, Treasure Island, Black Beauty, Moby-Dick, and many others.

The creation of a series of animated features based on classic children's stories was conceived by Jack Thinnes, Media Director at Sive Advertising in Cincinnati, Ohio. The series was created for a Sive client, toy manufacturer Kenner Products, and each program was fully sponsored by Kenner on CBS Television Network on Sunday, late afternoon or early evening, during the prime toy selling season before Christmas. In 1983, the show was billed as Kenner Family Classics.

The idea to use classic children's books sprang from Thinnes' viewing of a two-minute demo of Dickens' A Christmas Carol, which was produced by Walter J. Hucker's studio, Air Programs International (API), of Sydney, Australia. API was acquired by Hanna-Barbera in 1972 after Thinnes introduced the owners of the studios to one another. After the series ran on CBS for nearly ten years, it was moved into local syndication by Sive's syndication department. However, their adaptation of A Christmas Carol was such a favorite that it continued to run on the network for fifteen years.

A similar series, Festival of Family Classics, was produced by Rankin/Bass and aired in syndication in 1972–1973.

Episode list

Home video release 
Several of the Famous Classic Tales specials were released on VHS by Worldvision Home Video, GoodTimes Entertainment, Fox Lorber, Kids Klassics, Hanna-Barbera Home Video and Turner Home Entertainment. Several other stories made it to DVD afterwards, including a 2007 release from Southern Star by Koch Vision titled Hanna-Barbera Storybook Favorites which featured The Last of the Mohicans, Black Beauty and Gulliver's Travels. All of these are now out of print.

Warner Bros. Home Entertainment (via Turner Home Entertainment) currently handled home video distribution rights to several of the Famous Classic Tales specials (due to Neil Balnaves's death of boating accident on February 21, 2022).

References

External links 
 

1970 American television series debuts
1984 American television series endings
1970s American animated television series
1980s American animated television series
1970s American anthology television series
1980s American anthology television series
1970s American television specials
1980s American television specials
American children's animated anthology television series
1970 Australian television series debuts
1984 Australian television series endings
1970s Australian animated television series
English-language television shows
CBS original programming
CBS television specials
Hanna-Barbera television specials
Television series by Hanna-Barbera